Empis spectabilis is a species of dance flies in the family Empididae.

References

External links

 

Empis
Articles created by Qbugbot
Taxa named by Hermann Loew
Insects described in 1862